The archaeology of Ancient Egypt is the study of the archaeology of Egypt, stretching from prehistory through three millennia of documented history. Egyptian archeology is one of the branches of Egyptology.

Napoleon's invasion of Egypt in 1798 led to the Western passion for Egyptian antiquities. In the modern era, the Ministry of State for Antiquities controls excavation permits for Egyptologists. The field can now use geophysical methods and other applications of modern sensing techniques. John Romer, Zahi Hawass, Sarah Parcak, Toby Wilkinson are some of the prominent Egyptologists making excavations in Egypt today.

History 
English Egyptologist William Matthew Flinders Petrie, known as the "father of Egyptian archeology", introduced the archaeological techniques of field preservation, recording, and excavation methodology in the mid-1880s. Many highly educated amateurs also travelled to Egypt, including women such as Harriet Martineau, Headley Fellow and Florence Nightingale. In 1882, Amelia Edwards and Reginald Stuart Poole, an employee from the Department of Coins and Medals at the British Museum, decided to create the Egypt Exploration Fund as a way to raise funds for more excavations in the Nile Delta, which had rarely been visited.

First excavations 
The Rosetta Stone was discovered there in July 1799 by French officer Pierre-François Bouchard during the Napoleonic campaign in Egypt. It was the first Ancient Egyptian bilingual text recovered in modern times, and it aroused widespread public interest with its potential for deciphering this previously untranslated hieroglyphic script. Jean-François Champollion later broke the code of the Rosetta Stone.

Napoleon's men tried but failed to dig up and remove the statue of Younger Memnon to France during his 1798 expedition. During this attempt that the hole on the right of the torso (just above Ramesses's right nipple) is said to have been made. In 1815, following an idea mentioned to him by his friend Johann Ludwig Burckhardt of digging up the statue and bringing it to Britain, the British Consul General Henry Salt hired the adventurer Giovanni Belzoni in Cairo for this purpose. Using his hydraulics and engineering skills, he had it pulled on wooden rollers with ropes to the bank of the River Nile opposite Luxor by hundreds of workmen. However, no boat was yet available to take it up to Alexandria, so Belzoni carried out an expedition to Nubia, returning by October. With French collectors also in the area possibly looking to acquire the statue, he then sent workmen to Esna to obtain a suitable boat and in the meantime carried out further excavations in Thebes. He finally loaded the products of these digs, plus the Memnon, onto this boat and got it to Cairo by 15 December 1816. There he received and obeyed orders from Henry Salt to unload all but the Memnon, which was then sent on to Alexandria and London without him.

Archaeological timeline

19th century 
The great temple of Ramesses II at Abu Simbel was discovered in 1813 by the Swiss Orientalist and traveler Johann Ludwig Burckhardt. An enormous pile of sand almost completely covered the facade and its colossal statues, blocking the entrance for four more years. The Paduan explorer Belzoni reached its interior on 4 August 1817.

A life-size sarcophagus of the 19th Dynasty Pharaoh Seti I was rediscovered in 1817 by Belzoni in the Valley of the Kings.

The 3,200-year-old Statue of Ramesses II was discovered in 1820 by Giovanni Battista Caviglia at the Great Temple of Ptah near Memphis, Egypt. The statue was found broken in six pieces and earlier attempts at restoration had failed. In 1955, Egyptian Prime Minister Gamal Abdel Nasser moved it to Bab Al-Hadid Square in Cairo.

The mummy of Seti I was discovered by Émil Brugsch on June 6, 1881, in the mummy cache (tomb DB320) at Deir el-Bahri, and since then, it has been kept at the Egyptian Museum in Cairo.

Amenhotep's mummy was discovered in his original sarcophagus in March 1898, by Victor Loret in the KV35 tomb in the Valley of the Kings.

20th century 
The tomb of Nefertari, QV66, was discovered by Ernesto Schiaparelli in 1904. A flight of steps cut out of the rock gives access to the antechamber, which is decorated with paintings based on chapter seventeen of the Book of the Dead. The astronomical ceiling represents the heavens and is painted in dark blue, with a myriad of golden five-pointed stars. The east wall of the antechamber is interrupted by a large opening flanked by the representation of Osiris to the left and Anubis on the right; this, in turn, leads to the side chamber, decorated with offering-scenes, preceded by a vestibule in which paintings portray Nefertari presented to the deities, who welcome her. On the north wall of the antechamber is the stairway down to the burial-chamber, a vast quadrangular room covering a surface area of about 90 square metres (970 sq ft), its astronomical ceiling supported by four pillars, entirely decorated.

The entrance to KV55 was uncovered by Edward R. Ayrton on 6 January 1907. Its discovery was brought to the attention of Theodore M. Davis the following day. The tomb was first entered on 9 January by Ayrton, Davis, Joseph Lindon Smith, and (as the representative of the antiquities service) Arthur Weigall. On 11 January 1907, the findings were photographed. Ayrton then began clearing the tomb. On 25 January 1907, the coffin and mummy were investigated in situ.

In 1921, while excavating south of the tomb, Howard Carter discovered several items that seem to have originated in KV55. These included a jasper burnisher and some fragments of copper rosettes from a funerary pall.

After a systematic search, beginning in 1915, Carter discovered the actual tomb of Tutankhamun (KV62) in November 1922. By February 1923, the antechamber had been cleared of everything but two sentinel statues. A day and time were selected to unseal the tomb with about twenty appointed witnesses that included Lord Carnarvon, several Egyptian officials, museum representatives and the staff of the Government Press Bureau. On 17 February 1923, at just after two o'clock, the seal was broken. There were 5,398 items found in the tomb, including a solid gold coffin, face mask, thrones, archery bows, trumpets, a lotus chalice, two Imiut fetishes, gold toe stalls, furniture, food, wine, sandals, and fresh linen underwear. Howard Carter spent ten years cataloging the items.

In 1954, Egyptian archeologist Kamal el-Mallakh discovered a ship buried in pieces right beside the Great Pyramid of Khufu. It was largely built of Lebanon cedar planking in the "shell-first" construction technique, using unpegged tenons of Christ's thorn. The ship was built with a flat bottom composed of several planks, but no actual keel, with the planks and frames lashed together with Halfah grass, and has been reconstructed from 1,224 pieces which had been laid in a logical, disassembled order in the pit beside the pyramid.

Though KV5 was partially excavated as early as 1825, its true extent was discovered in 1995 by Kent R. Weeks and his exploration team. It has proven to be the largest tomb in the Valley of the Kings, and originally contained the mummified remains of some of this king's estimated 52 sons. Approximately 150 corridors and tomb chambers have been located in this tomb as of 2006, and the tomb may contain as many as 200 corridors and chambers.

21st century 
In June 2000, the European Institute for Underwater Archaeology (IEASM), directed by Franck Goddio, in cooperation with the Egyptian Ministry for Antiquities discovered the ancient sunken city of Thonis-Heracleion in today’s Abu Qir Bay. The statues of a colossal King and Queen are on display at the Grand Egyptian Museum. Other discovered artefacts are exhibited at the Bibliotheca Alexandrina and Alexandria National Museum (ANM). The excavations are documented through several publications

In June 2011, an archaeological team led by French Egyptologists Pierre Tallet and Gregory Marouard, organized by the French Institute of Oriental Archeology (IFAO), restarted work at the site. Among other materials, a collection of hundreds of papyrus fragments was found in 2013 dating back 4500 years. The papyrus is currently exhibited at the Egyptian Museum in Cairo. The Egyptian archaeologist Zahi Hawass called this ancient papyrus “the greatest discovery in Egypt in the 21st century”.

In March 2017, the Egyptian-German team of archaeologists unearthed an eight-meter 3,000-year-old statue that included a head and a torso thought to depict Pharaoh Ramses II. According to Khaled El-Enany, the Egyptian Antiquities Minister, the statue was more likely thought to be King Psammetich I. Excavators also revealed an 80 cm-long part of a limestone statue of Pharaoh Seti II while excavating the site.

In August 2017, archaeologists from the Ministry of Antiquities announced the discovery of five mud-brick tombs at Bir esh-Shaghala, dating back nearly 2000 years. Researchers also revealed worn masks gilded with gold, several large jars and a piece of pottery with unsolved ancient Egyptian writing on it.

In November 2017(2000-10-25), the Egyptian mission in cooperation with the European Institute for Underwater Archaeology announced the discovery of three 2,000-year-old  sunken shipwrecks dated back to the Roman Era in Alexandria's Abu Qir Bay.

In April 2018, the Egyptian Ministry of Antiquities announced the discovery of the head of the bust of Roman Emperor Marcus Aurelius at the Temple of Kom Ombo in Aswan during work to protect the site from groundwater.

In April 2018, the Egyptian Ministry of Antiquities announced the discovery of the shrine of the god Osiris Ptah Neb, dating back to the 25th dynasty in the Temple of Karnak in Luxor. According to archaeologist Essam Nagy, the material remains from the area contained clay pots, the lower part of a sitting statue and part of a stone panel showing an offering table filled with a sheep and a goose which were the symbols of the god Amun.

In July 2018, German-Egyptian researchers’ team head by Ramadan Badry Hussein of the University of Tübingen reported the discovery of an extremely rare gilded burial mask that probably dates from the Saite-Persian period in a partly damaged wooden coffin in Saqqara. The last time a similar mask was found was in 1939. The eyes were covered with obsidian, calcite, and black hued gemstones, possibly onyx. "The finding of this mask could be called a sensation. Very few masks of precious metal have been preserved to the present day, because the tombs of most Ancient Egyptian dignitaries were looted in ancient times" said Hussein.

In July 2018, archaeologists led by Zeinab Hashish announced the discovery of a 2.000-year-old 30-ton black granite sarcophagus in Alexandria. It contained three damaged skeletons in red-brown sewage water. According to archaeologist Mostafa Waziri, the skeletons looked like a family burial with a middle-aged woman and two men. Researchers also revealed a small gold artifact and three thin sheets of gold.

In September 2018, a sandstone sphinx statue was discovered at the temple of Kom Ombo in Aswan. The statue, measuring approximately 28 cm (11 in) in width and 38 cm (15 in) in height, likely dates to the Ptolemaic Dynasty.

In November, 2018, an Egyptian archaeological mission located seven ancient Egyptian tombs at the ancient necropolis of Saqqara containing a collection of scarab and cat mummies dating back to the Fifth and Sixth Dynasties. Three of the tombs were for cats, some dating back more than 6,000 years, while one of four other sarcophagi was unsealed. With the remains of cat mummies were unearthed 100 gilded and wooden statues of cats, and one in bronze, dedicated to the cat goddess Bastet. In addition, funerary items dating back to the 12th Dynasty were found beside the skeletal remains of the cats.

In November 2018, France's University of Strasbourg announced the discovery of two sarcophagi thought to be more than 3,500 years old with two perfectly preserved mummies and approximately 1,000 funerary statues in the Assasseef valley near Luxor. One of the tombs with paintings where the female body found, was opened to the public in front of the international media, but the other one was previously opened by Egyptian antiquities officials.

According to the Al-Ahram, in January 2019, archaeologists headed by Mostafa Waziri revealed a collection of 20 tombs dated back to the Second Intermediate Period in Kom Al-Khelgan. The burials contained the remains of animals, amulets, and scarabs carved from faience, round and oval pots with handholds, flint knives, broken and burned pottery. All burials included skulls and skeletons in the bending position and were not very well-preserved.

In February 2019, fifty mummy collections wrapped in linen, stone coffins or wooden sarcophagi dated back to the Ptolemaic Kingdom were discovered by Egyptian archaeologists in the Tuna El-Gebel site in Minya. 12 of the graves in four burial chambers 9 m (30 ft) deep, belonged to children. One of the remains was the partly uncovered skull enclosed in linen. Egypt’s Minister of Tourism and Antiquities announced the discovery of the collective graves of senior officials and high clergies of the god Djehuty (Thoth) in Tuna el-Gebel in January, 2020. An archaeological mission headed by Mustafa Waziri reported that 20 sarcophagi and coffins of various shapes and sizes, including five sarcophagi made of limestone and carved with hieroglyphic texts, as well as 16 tombs and five well-preserved wooden coffins were unearthed by their team.

On 13 April 2019, an expedition led by a member of the Czech Institute of Egyptology, Mohamed Megahed, discovered a 4,000-year-old tomb near Egypt's Saqqara Necropolis. Archaeologists confirmed that the tomb belonged to an influential person named Khuwy, who lived in Egypt during the 5th Dynasty."The L-shaped Khuwy tomb starts with a small corridor heading downwards into an antechamber and from there a larger chamber with painted reliefs depicting the tomb owner seated at an offerings table", reported Megahed. Some paintings maintained their brightness over a long time in the tomb. Mainly made of white limestone bricks, the tomb had a tunnel entrance generally typical for pyramids. Archaeologists say that there might be a connection between Khuwy and pharaoh because the mausoleum was found near the pyramid of Egyptian Pharaoh Djedkare Isesi, who ruled during that time.

Archaeologists discovered 35 mummified remains of Egyptians in a tomb in Aswan in April 2019. Italian archaeologist Patrizia Piacentini, professor of Egyptology at the University of Milan, and Khaled El-Enany, the Egyptian minister of antiquities reported that the tomb where the remains of ancient men, women and children were found, dates back to the Greco-Roman period between 332 BC and 395 AD. While the findings assumed belonging to a mother and a child were well preserved, others had suffered major destruction. Beside the mummies, artefacts including painted funerary masks, vases of bitumen used in mummification, pottery and wooden figurines were revealed. Thanks to the hieroglyphics on the tomb, it was detected that the tomb belongs to a tradesman named Tjit.

In July 2019, ancient granite columns and a smaller Greek temple, treasure-laden ships, along with bronze coins from the reign of Ptolemy II, pottery dating back to the third and fourth centuries BC were found at the sunken city of Heracleion. The investigations were conducted by Egyptian and European divers led by underwater archaeologist Franck Goddio. They also uncovered the ruins of the city's main temple off of Egypt's north coast.

In September 2019, archaeologists announced the discovery of a 2,200-year-old temple believed to belong to the Ptolemy IV Philosopher of the Ptolemaic Kingdom in Kom Shakau village of Tama township. Researchers also revealed limestone walls carved with inscriptions of Hapi, the Nile god, and inscriptions with fragments of text featuring the name of Ptolemy IV.

In October 2019, Egyptian archeologists headed by Zahi Hawass revealed an ancient "industrial area" used to manufacture decorative artefacts, furniture and pottery for royal tombs in Luxor's Valley of the Monkeys. The site contained a big kiln to fire ceramics and 30 ateliers. According to Zahi Hawass, each atelier had a different aim – some of them were used to make pottery, others used to produce gold artefacts and others still to churn out furniture. About 75 meters below the valley, several items believed to have adorned wooden royal coffins, such as inlaid beads, silver rings and gold foil were unearthed. Some artefacts depicted the wings of deity Horus.

In October 2019, the Egyptian archaeological mission unearthed thirty well-preserved wooden coffins (3,000-year-old) in front of the Mortuary Temple of Hatshepsut in El-Assasif Cemetery. The coffins contained mummies of twenty-three adult males, five adult females and two children, who are believed to be from the middle class. According to Hawass, mummies were decorated with mixed carvings and designs, including scenes from Egyptian gods, hieroglyphs, and the Book of the Dead, a series of spells that allowed the soul to navigate in the afterlife. Some of the coffins had the names of the dead engraved on them.

According to the Egypt's Ministry of Antiquities, in February, 2020, Egyptian archaeologists have uncovered 83 tombs dating back to 4,000 B.C known as Naqada III period. Various small pottery pots in different shapes and some sea shells, makeup tools, eyeliner pots, and jewels were also revealed in the burial.

In May 2020, Egyptian-Spanish archaeological mission head by Esther Ponce uncovered a unique cemetery dating back to the 26th Dynasty (so-called the El-Sawi era) at the site of ancient Oxyrhynchus. Archaeologists found tombstones, bronze coins, small crosses, and clay seals inside eight Roman-era tombs with domed and unmarked roofs.

On 3 October 2020, Khalid el-Anany, Egypt’s tourism and antiquities minister announced the discovery of at least 59 sealed sarcophagi with mummies more than 2,600 years old in Saqqara. Archaeologists also revealed the 20 statues of Ptah-Soker and a carved 35-centimeter tall bronze statue of god Nefertem.

On 19 October 2020, the Ministry of Tourism and Antiquities announced the discovery of more than 2,500 years of colorful, sealed sarcophagi in Saqqara. The archaeological team unearthed gilded, wooden statues and more than 80 coffins.

In November, 2020, archaeologists unearthed more than 100 delicately painted wooden coffins and 40 funeral statues. The sealed, wooden coffins, some containing mummies, date as far back as 2,500 years. Other artifacts discovered include funeral masks, canopic jars and amulets. According to Khaled el-Anany, tourism and antiquities minister, the items date back to the Ptolemaic dynasty. One of the coffins was opened and a mummy was scanned with an X-ray, determining it was most likely a man about the age of 40.

In January 2021, The tourism and antiquities ministry announced the discovery of more than 50 wooden sarcophagi in 52 burial shafts which date back to the New Kingdom period and a 13 ft-long papyrus that contains texts from the Book of the Dead.Archaeologists led by Zahi Hawass also found the funerary temple of Naert and warehouses made of bricks in Saqqara.

In January 2021, Egyptian-Dominican researchers led by Kathleen Martínez announced the discovery of 2,000-year-old ancient tombs with golden tongues dating to the Greek and Roman periods at Taposiris Magna. The team also unearthed gold leaf amulets in the form of tongues placed for speaking with the god Osiris in the afterlife. The mummies were depicted in different forms: one of them was wearing a crown, decorated with horns, and the cobra snake at the forehead. The other was depicted with gilded decorations, representing the wide necklace.

In February 2021, archaeologists from the Egyptian Ministry of Tourism and Antiquities announced the discovery of a Ptolemaic period temple, a Roman fort, an early Coptic church and an inscription written in hieratic script at an archaeological site called Shiha Fort in Aswan. According to Mostafa Waziri, the crumbling temple was decorated with palm leaf carvings and an incomplete sandstone panel that described a Roman emperor. According to researcher Abdel Badie, generally, the church with about 2.1 meters width contained an oven that was used to bake pottery, four rooms, a long hall, stairs, and stone tiles.

In April 2021, Egyptian archeologists announced the discovery of 110 burial tombs at the Koum el-Khulgan archeological site in the Dakahlia Governorate. 68 oval-shaped tombs of them dated back to the Predynastic Period and 37 rectangular-shaped tombs were from Second Intermediate Period. The rest of them dated back to the Naqada III period. The tombs also contained the remains of adults and a baby (buried in a jar), a group of ovens, stoves, remnants of mud-brick foundations, funerary equipment, cylindrical, pear-shaped vessels and a bowl with geometric designs.

In 2021 September, archaeologists announce the discovery of ritualistic tools used in religious rituals at the ancient site of Tel al-Fara in the Kafr El-Sheikh Governorate. Remains included a limestone pillar depicting goddes Hathor, some incense burners with the head of the god Horus. Dr. Hossam Ghanim, said: “The mission also discovered a huge building of polished limestone from the inside, representing a well for holy water used in daily rituals”.

In April 2022, an Egyptian archeological expedition discovered an ancient Roman pottery workshop at the Tibet-Matrouh site, west of Alexandria.

In May 2022, the discovery of the nearly 4,300-year-old tomb of an ancient Egyptian high-ranked person who handled royal, sealed documents of pharaoh was announced at Saqqara. According to University of Warsaw’s Polish Centre of Mediterranean Archaeology, the elaborately decorated tomb belonged to a man named Mehtjetju who served as a priest and an inspector of the royal property. Kamil O. Kuraszkiewicz, expedition director stated that Mehtjetju  most likely lived at about the same time, at some point during the reigns of the first three rulers of the Sixth Dynasty: Teti, Userkare and Pepy I.

In June 2022, archaeologists from The Cairo Ministry of Antiquities announced the discovery of an alabaster bust of Alexander the Great as well as molds and other materials for creating amulets for warriors and for statues of Alexander the Great.

In July 2022, archaeologists from the Prague’s Charles University, led by Dr Marslav Barta, discovered the robbed tomb of an ancient Egyptian military official named Wahibre merry Neith. Wahibre commanded battalions of non-local soldiers and lived in the late 26th dynasty and early 27th dynasty, around 500 BC, according to the Egyptian Antiquities Ministry. Inside the main well there was a smaller and deeper shaft which contained two sarcophagi one inside the other where Wahibre-merry-Neith was buried. The external sarcophagus was made of white limestone while the internal coffin was made out of basalt rock measures 2.30 meters long and 1.98 meters wide. The inner sarcophagus contained an inscription from the 72nd chapter of the Egyptian Book of Dead said Dr Marslav Barta.

In August 2022, archaeologists from the Polish Academy of Sciences in Warsaw announced the discovery of a 4,500-year-old temple dedicated to the Egyptian sun god Ra. The recently discovered sun temple was made from mud bricks and was about 60 meters long by 20 m wide. According to Massimiliano Nuzzolo, co-director of the excavation, storage rooms and other rooms may have been served for cultic purposes and the walls of the building were all plastered in black and white. The L-shaped entrance portico had two limestone columns and was partly made of white limestone. Dozens of well-preserved beer jars and several well-made and red-lined vessels, seal impressions, including seals of the pharaohs who ruled during the fifth and sixth dynasties were also uncovered. One of the earliest seals might belonged to pharaoh Shepseskare, who ruled Egypt before Nyuserre.

Ministry of Antiquities (Egypt) 
An edict issued by the Egyptian governor, Muhammad Ali Pasha, on August 15, 1835, banned the export and trade of all Egyptian antiques to another country. The decree helped to protect monuments and curb the smuggling of ancient Egyptian artifacts.

The Ministry of Tourism & Antiquities (officially called the "Antiquities Authority") is the Egyptian government organization which serves to protect and preserve the heritage and ancient history of Egypt. It was established in 1858.

In December 2019 it was merged into the Ministry of Tourism, with Khaled El-Anany retaining his function.

From 2009 to 2014, the ministry worked with the Getty Conservation Institute on the management and conservation of the tomb of Tutankhamun.

See also 

 Egyptology
Ancient Egypt
Contemporary archaeology

References 

Archaeology articles needing expert attention
Ancient Egypt
Archaeology of Egypt
Egypt history-related lists
Art of ancient Egypt